Clover Township is one of twenty-four townships in Henry County, Illinois, USA.  As of the 2010 census, its population was 938 and it contained 428 housing units.  Clover Township was originally known as Ashnelet Township, but was changed on an unknown date.

Geography

Cities, towns, villages
 Woodhull (partial)

Adjacent townships
 Andover Township (north)
 Weller Township (east)
 Walnut Grove Township, Knox County (southeast)
 Ontario Township, Knox County (south)
 Rio Township, Knox County (southwest)
 Oxford Township (west)
 Lynn Township (northwest)

Cemeteries
The township contains these two cemeteries: Clover Chapel and Woodhull.

Major highways
  Illinois Route 17

Demographics

School districts
 Alwood Community Unit School District 225
 Cambridge Community Unit School District 227

Political districts
 Illinois's 17th congressional district
 State House District 74
 State Senate District 37

References
 
 United States Census Bureau 2008 TIGER/Line Shapefiles
 United States National Atlas

External links
 City-Data.com
 Illinois State Archives
 Township Officials of Illinois

Townships in Henry County, Illinois
Townships in Illinois